Burton Latimer Ward, representing the town of Burton Latimer, is a 3-member ward within Kettering Borough Council. The ward was last fought at Borough Council level in the 2007 local council elections, in which two seats were won by Independent candidates and one seat won by the Conservatives.

The current councillors are Cllr. Ruth Groome, Cllr. Jan Smith and Cllr. John Currall.

Councillors
Kettering Borough Council Elections 2007
Christopher Groome (Independent)
Ruth Groome (Independent)
Derek Zanger (Conservative)

Current Ward Boundaries (2007-)

Kettering Borough Council Elections 2007
Note: due to boundary changes, vote changes listed below are based on notional results.

See also
Kettering
Kettering Borough Council

Electoral wards in Kettering